The  is a hill, in the Eifel mountains of Germany. It is located in the county of Ahrweiler in the state of Rhineland-Palatinate. It rises north of the lake of Laacher See in the area of the village of Wassenach.

The  is the cinder cone of a volcano that erupted during the Quaternary period. Because there are no reference strata, its age cannot be accurately estimated. The  produced three lava flows, of which the first and easily the largest spread out northwards from the crater rim in the west. The two lava streams that run in a southerly direction are nowhere near as large and were first identified from magnetic surveys because they were covered by a layer of pumice. At the top of the Veitskopf is the Lydia Tower which enables an all-round view that includes the Laacher See, the Brohltal valley and even the Siebengebirge hills.

Footnotes and references

References 

Mountains and hills of the Eifel
Cinder cones
Ahrweiler (district)